Sakka is an Arabic surname. Notable people with the surname include:

Ahmed El Sakka (born 1973), Egyptian actor
Louai Sakka (born 1972), Syrian terrorist 

Arabic-language surnames